Saadia Faruqi is a Pakistani-American author.

Originally from Karachi, Pakistan, Faruqi moved to the United States in 1998. She completed her bachelor's degree in business administration from the University of Central Florida and her master's degree in liberal arts from Baker University in Kansas. After 9/11 and while she still worked as a grant writer, Faruqi began writing about Islam for a local newspaper in Houston, Texas as a way to combat Muslim stereotypes. After this work, she led educational discussions and training sessions about Islam at different institutions, including churches, synagogues, schools and police departments.

Several years after 9/11, frustrated by the lack of understanding and acceptance she saw in the west regarding Muslims, Faruqi began her fiction career. Her debut book was a collection of short stories about life in Pakistan, titled Brick Walls: Tales of Hope & Courage From Pakistan. The book was released in 2015. Her first children's book, Meet Yasmin! was released in 2018 and focuses on the adventures of a seven-year-old Pakistani-American girl. The book is part of a series of books with the character Yasmin, illustrated by Hatem Aly. At the end of each book, a glossary of Urdu words, facts about Pakistan, and related activities are included. The Yasmin series has won numerous accolades, including Parents Magazine's Best Summer Reading Books for Kids 2019 and NPR's Best Children's Books of 2020.

On August 11, 2020, the middle grade novel A Place at the Table was published, co-written by Faruqi and Laura Shovan. The book is about two 11-year-olds—Pakistani-American Sara and Elizabeth, who is Jewish—who develop a friendship after becoming cooking partners in class. Faruqi and Shovan embarked on this project as a way to address the dichotomy that arises in immigrant families between parents and grandparents born in the home country versus first generation children born in the adopted country. Food is an important theme in this novel, as a way to connect cultures, traditions and families. In 2021, A Place at the Table won the South Asia Book award highly commended title.

On October 6, 2020, Faruqi published her first solo middle grade novel A Thousand Questions about eleven-year-old Pakistani American girl Mimi who visits Pakistan during summer vacation to meet her grandparents. There, she meets servant girl Sakina, and they form an unlikely friendship across class lines. A Thousand Questions won honor at the South Asian Book Awards in 2021.

On September 7, 2021, Faruqi released Yusuf Azeem Is Not A Hero, a middle grade novel highlighting the attacks of 9/11. This book focuses solely on the experiences of the Muslim American community during and after 9/11, a perspective she felt was missing from other children's books about the attacks. This book highlights Islamophobia, racism, white supremacy and a host of other themes through the eyes of twelve-year-old Yusuf, whose small Texas town is commemorating the twentieth anniversary of the attacks. Included in the novel are journal entries by Yusuf's uncle Rahman, who was a young boy in 2001. Yusuf Azeem was one of School Library Journal's Best Middle Grade Novels in 2021.

Faruqi has also written nonfiction books for young readers, aimed at removing stereotypes of Muslims and presenting accurate information about their achievements. Included are Eid-al-Fitr Mad Libs, and The Wonders We Seek: Thirty Incredible Muslims Who Helped Shape The World, co-written with her mother Aneesa Mumtaz.

References

Living people
Writers from Karachi
American writers of Pakistani descent
Year of birth missing (living people)
Pakistani emigrants to the United States
21st-century American short story writers
21st-century American women writers
American women children's writers
American children's writers